Beverly Massey Woolley (born July 25, 1939) is a Republican former member of the Texas House of Representatives representing District 136 which then covered part of Harris County, Texas, before the district was moved to suburban Austin in Williamson County.

Woolley was the co-chair of the Tea Party caucus in the Texas House.  In 2011, Woolley was chosen to replace the Democrat Craig Eiland of Galveston as Speaker pro tempore after Republicans captured a super majority of seats (101 of 150) in the 2010 elections.

Woolley owned property in the Stablewood subdivision in Houston and about 1994 had planned to build a house in the subdivision.

External links

 Beverly Woolley, Texas House of Representatives
 Coalition of Texans with Disabilities

References

1939 births
Living people
Republican Party members of the Texas House of Representatives
Women state legislators in Texas
21st-century American politicians
21st-century American women politicians